Soldatovo is a rural locality (a selo) in Akutikhinsky Selsoviet, Bystroistoksky District, Altai Krai, Russia. The population was 116 as of 2013. There are 6 streets.

Geography 
Soldatovo is located 176 km SSW of Bystry Istok (the district's administrative centre) by road, on the Ob River. Verkh-Ozyornoye is the nearest rural locality.

References 

Rural localities in Bystroistoksky District